Wolfgang Menzel (21 or 26 June 179823 April 1873), German poet, critic and literary historian, was born at Waldenburg (Wałbrzych) in Silesia.

Career overview
He studied at the Breslau, Jena, and Bonn, and after living for some time in Aarau and Heidelberg finally settled in Stuttgart, where, from 1830 to 1838, he had a seat in the Württemberg Diet.

His first work, a clever and original volume of poems, entitled Streckverse (Heidelberg, 1823), was followed in 1824-1825 by a popular Geschichte der Deutschen in three volumes and in 1829 and 1830 by Rubezahl and Narcissus, the dramatized fairy-stories upon which his reputation as a poet chiefly rests. In 1851 he published the romance of Furore, a lively picture of the period of the Thirty Years' War; his other writings include Geschichte Europas, 1789-1815 (2 vols. Stuttgart, 1853), and histories of the German War of 1866 and of the Franco-German War of 1870-71.

From 1826 to 1848 Menzel edited a Literaturblatt in connection with the Morgenblatt; in the latter year he transferred his allegiance from the Liberal to the Conservative party, and in 1852 his Literaturblatt was revived in that interest. In 1866 his political sympathies again changed, and he opposed the particularism of the Prussian Junkers and the anti-unionism of south Germany. He died on 23 April 1873 in Stuttgart. His library of 18,000 volumes was afterwards acquired for the University of Strassburg.

Menzel was a strident opponent of innovation in poetry and in particular of Heinrich Heine.

Works
 German Literature, Vol. 2, Vol. 3. Boston: Hilliard, Gray and Company, 1840.
 “Nationality and Cosmopolitsm,” The American Eclectic, No. 3, Art. IV, January 1842.
 The History of Germany: From the Earliest Period to 1842, Vol. 2, Vol. 3. London: Henry G. Bohn, 1852.

References

External links
 
 
 

1798 births
1873 deaths
Bibliophiles
German literary critics
German poets
People from Wałbrzych
People from the Province of Silesia
University of Bonn alumni
University of Jena alumni
University of Breslau alumni
Members of the Württembergian Chamber of Deputies
German male poets
19th-century poets
19th-century German writers
19th-century German male writers
German male non-fiction writers